Dermod McMurrough O'Brien, 5th Baron Inchiquin (October 1594 – 29 December 1624) was an Irish baron.

Biography 
Dermod, who was born in October 1594, was the son of Murrough O'Brien, 4th Baron Inchiquin (1562 – 24 July 1597), the son of Murrough McDermot O'Brien, 3rd Baron Inchiquin and Mabel Nugent, daughter of Christopher Nugent, 6th Baron Delvin. He inherited the barony at the age of two.

Family 
Dermod O'Brien married Ellen, eldest daughter of Sir Edmund FitzJohn FitzGerald of Cloyne and Ballymaloe House in County Cork, from that powerful Hiberno-Norman family. They had four sons, and several daughters:
Murrough, 6th Baron Inchiquin, their eldest son, became the first Earl of Inchiquin.
 Henry (d. 1645), a lieutenant colonel in the army of King Charles I.
 Christopher (died 1664), a lieutenant-colonel in the Irish Confederate Army, who was created "Baron of Inchiquin," by the Supreme Council of the Catholic Confederation. He never married.
Murtough O'Brien, who led a guerrilla campaign against Cromwell's generals in the Burren. He later obtained a pardon and emigrated to Spain where he became a general in the Spanish army
 Honora, who married Anthony Stoughton of Rattoo, County Kerry.
 Mary, married Michael Boyle, Archbishop of Armagh, and Lord Chancellor of Ireland, and had with him numerous children, including Murrough Boyle, 1st Viscount Blesington, and Eleanor (who became the wife of the William Hill of Hillsborough, M.P., and mother to Michael Hill (1672–1699) M.P.).
Ann, died unmarried

Ancestors

See also 
Early Barons Inchiquin
Baron Inchiquin
O'Brien Pedigree

Notes

References

Bibliography 
 
 
 
  Endnotes:
 
 
 
 

1594 births
1624 deaths
17th-century Irish people
People from County Clare
Dermod
Barons Inchiquin